Johan Stenflo (born 1940) is a Swedish chemist and teacher.  He received his M.D. in 1968 and his Ph.D. in 1973 at Lund University, where he later became a professor of clinical chemistry. In 1985, he became a member of the Royal Swedish Academy of Sciences. He is also a member of the Norwegian Academy of Science and Letters. In 1975, he published a classic paper on the biosynthesis of prothrombin.

His doctoral students include Björn Dahlbäck.

References 

1940 births
Living people
Swedish chemists
Lund University alumni
Academic staff of Lund University
Members of the Royal Swedish Academy of Sciences
Members of the Norwegian Academy of Science and Letters